Škripari is the name of the football supporters of bosnian-hercegovinian club NK Široki Brijeg. They also support Široki Brijeg's other sport clubs, primarily HKK Široki in basketball.

The fan club as it exists today was named on 9 September 1996. At that time (from the season 1993–1994 onwards, reaching a peak in 1998), Škripari were the only real supporters in Herzegovina, aside from a small fraction of supporters in Ljubuški, as well as Torcida Kiseljak and Torcida Mostar who were only really active in home matches of the teams that they supported.

Škripari have once been involved in an incident involving a display of a flag with a swastika on it. This was widely criticized by the football governing bodies.

Croatian nationalism is still present among the fans of the club, being the incidents such as occurred on December 1, 2019, in a 19th-round game of Bosnian Premier League against Bosnian Serb team, FK Zvijezda 09, which was taken as an opportunity by Škripari to glorify Slobodan Praljak, Croatian general accused for war crimes by the Hague Tribunal, as a clear provocation toward the opposing team.

Although from Bosnia and Herzegovina, Škripari support the Croatia national football team primarily, as well as other Croatian national teams.

References

External links

NK Široki Brijeg official website
HKK Široki Brijeg official website

Bosnia and Herzegovina football supporters' associations
NK Široki Brijeg
Ultras groups